The Ven. Thomas Berkeley Randolph , MA (15 March 1904 – 31 May 1987) was Archdeacon of Hereford from 1959 to 1970.

He was educated at Christ's Hospital, The Queen's College, Oxford and Ripon College Cuddesdon; and ordained in 1928. After a curacy in Portsea he was Chaplain at St. Paul’s Cathedral, Calcutta. He held incumbencies in Eastleigh, Reading and Wellington, Herefordshire. He was a Canon Residentiary at Hereford Cathedral from 1961 to 1970.

Notes

1904 births
People educated at Christ's Hospital
Alumni of The Queen's College, Oxford
Alumni of Ripon College Cuddesdon
Archdeacons of Hereford
1987 deaths